State Road 34 (NM 34) is a state highway in the US state of New Mexico.

Major intersections

See also

References

034
Transportation in San Miguel County, New Mexico